Marydale Entrata (born May 6, 1997), better known by her stage name Maymay Entrata, is a Filipino actress, singer, television host, and model. She came to prominence in 2017, after winning Pinoy Big Brother: Lucky 7. Born in Camiguin, and raised in Cagayan de Oro, Misamis Oriental, Entrata aspired to be an actress from a young age and had auditioned in different talent shows to fulfill her dream.

After winning Pinoy Big Brother, Entrata signed a deal with Star Magic and began her acting career by starring in the romantic comedy Loving in Tandem (2017). Entrata's other film appearances include Da One That Ghost Away (2018) and Hello, Love, Goodbye (2019). She also played supporting roles in horror-fantasy drama television series La Luna Sangre (2017) and Hiwaga ng Kambat (2019).

Throughout her career, Entrata has expressed an interest in singing and modelling. Her eponymous debut album, released in 2017, has been certified platinum by the PARI. She was also recognized as the first Filipino to walk in the Arab Fashion Week.

Personal life 
Maymay Entrata was born as Marydale Entrata in Camiguin on May 6, 1997. She and her older brother Vincent were left in the care of their grandparents in Cagayan de Oro as their father left them behind when she was just a year old, and her mother, Lorna, decided to work in Japan to provide for the whole family. Entrata also has a younger half brother named Rio from her mother's family in Japan.

Entrata was a college junior studying technology communication management at the Mindanao University of Science and Technology but she placed it on hold when she joined Pinoy Big Brother. During an interview in 2019, she mentioned that in school, she was more into social studies, arts and music, and extra-curricular activities like dancing and other events. She stated that Mathematics and English are not her best subjects; that is why when she entered the collegiate level, she chose to major in the latter to improve on the language.

Starting at the age of 14, Entrata began auditioning for various reality television shows to fulfill her ambition of becoming an actress. She first attempted auditioning for Pinoy Big Brother: Teen Clash 2010 when she was in high school but was unfortunately rebuffed. Five years later, she tried joining the same show's sixth season: Pinoy Big Brother: 737 but also failed. Entrata also tried her luck at talent competition television series like The Voice, and Pilipinas Got Talent but she also did not make it.

Career 
After being rejected several times, Entrata almost did not audition for Pinoy Big Brother: Lucky 7 however, when her grandfather Joe got ill, she saw it as a reason to try again. She underwent several auditions before she successfully  joined the show. During the show's duration, Entrata's grandfather died due to cardiac arrest and she had to temporarily exit the house to visit his wake in Camiguin. While inside the PBB house, Entrata wrote and recorded the song "Baliw" ("Crazy") which was released by Star Music in different music streaming media. Entrata was later announced as a semi-finalist on the show and had to temporarily exit due to the program's format. Meanwhile, Entrata, together with the other semi-finalists, Edward Barber, and Kisses Delavin, took part in an online reality series called Follow the Lucky 3 Teens, which follows their journey after exiting the house. Entrata went on to win the competition on March 5, 2017, at the Alonte Sports Arena, earning 42.71% of the votes against runners-up Delavin, Yong Muhajil, and Barber.

After winning Pinoy Big Brother, Entrata began her acting career with a lead role in her lifestory episode of the ABS-CBN drama anthology series Maalaala Mo Kaya (MMK). A month after her TV debut, she signed a recording contract with Star Music. In May 2017, Entrata made her film debut in the romantic comedy film Loving in Tandem, in which she played the lead role of a happy-go-lucky girl named Shine, a young woman trying to make ends meet for her family. The film was co-starred by her fellow Pinoy Big Brother contestants Barber, Delavin, and Marco Gallo. Oggs Cruz of Rappler considered the film to be "surprisingly charming" and credited Entrata for her "dignified performance, one that is grounded not in discrepancy but on very relatable appeal". Her performance earned her a nomination for New Movie Actress of the Year at the PMPC Star Awards for Movies.

Following her lead role in Maalaala Mo Kaya, Entrata took on a supporting role at the horror-fantasy drama television series La Luna Sangre—the third installment of Lobo and a sequel to Imortal, starring Kathryn Bernardo and Daniel Padilla. On June 21, 2017, she launched her eponymous debut album at the SM North EDSA SkyDome, selling 2,000 physical copies at the venue alone, and over 7,500 copies on the day of its release. It was later certified gold on June 26, 2017, and platinum, on September 17, 2017, by the Philippine Association of the Record Industry (PARI).

To further expand her musical career, Entrata headlined her The Dream concert on February 23, 2018 at the Kia Theater (now New Frontier), where she was accompanied by Barber, Enchong Dee, and 4th Impact. The concert's success led her to embarked on The Dream Tour to promote her music. She also had other concert appearances, performing in 4th Impact's Rise Up concert at the SkyDome and in with Maja Salvador's MAJA on Stage concert at the Kia Theater. After her tour, Entrata appeared at the horror comedy Da One That Ghost Away, starring Kim Chiu and Ryan Bang. Oggs Cruz considered the film as a "complete and utter mess" and described her character as "blatantly useless". Entrata then played a lead role opposite Barber on a miniseries in the fantasy anthology Wansapanataym, where she played a fake fortune teller named Espie. In November 2018, Entrata was invited by Dubai-based Filipino fashion designer Furne One Amato to audition for the Arab Fashion Week in Dubai. She headlined Amato's fashion label, Amato Couture, making her the first Filipina to do so. Also that year, Entrata began her hosting career in the variety show ASAP when she hosted the program's online counterpart called ASAP Chillout (now iWant ASAP). Her final film of the year was in the fantasy comedy Fantastica.

In 2019, Entrata hosted World of Dance Online along with Riva Quenery, AC Bonifacio, and Georcelle Dapat-Sy. In March 2019, Entrata played an Aeta beauty queen named Judith in another MMK episode, directed by John Lapus. The episode received mixed reviews on social media, mostly on Twitter, with viewers praising Entrata for her performance, to some questioning the lack of diversity in the Philippine entertainment industry for casting non-Aeta actors, and for artificially darkening their skins particularly Entrata's character to appropriate the indigenous group. A month after, she released her second studio album #M0806 for streaming and digital download. She then appeared as Sarah in the drama series Hiwaga ng Kambat starring Barber and Grae Fernandez. Entrata next took a supporting role in Cathy Garcia-Molina's romantic drama Hello, Love, Goodbye where she played an overseas Filipino worker in Hong Kong. Her performance received mixed reviews. Julia Allende of the Philippine Entertainment Portal believed that Entrata, together with Kakai Bautista and Lovely Abella supplied most of the comedic relief and kept things lively throughout the film. Writing for BusinessMirror, Tito Genova Valliente considered their performances as "not only over-the-top, but over any tolerable intelligent decibel". Regardless, the film earned ₱880 million ($17.8 million) worldwide making it the highest grossing Philippine film to this date. She ended the year by starring on another MMK episode, playing Maxine Blanco, a bone cancer patient who went viral when her boyfriend posted their love story on Facebook.

In January 2021, Entrata starred in the romantic comedy Princess DayaReese portraying both a con artist and a princess, who temporarily switched roles.

Other ventures

Philanthropy 
On December 19, 2017, Entrata, Barber, and her sister Laura, launched the ELM Tree Foundation, a non-profit organization that focuses on empowering the underprivileged youth. It takes its name from the initials of their name.

Product endorsements 
Entrata together with on-screen partner Edward Barber joined McDonald's as endorsers. In September 2017, Entrata was appointed as one of Vivo Philippines brand ambassadors. In October 2017, she became one of the ambassadors for Vice Ganda’s make-up line Vice Cosmetics. In November 2017, she also became the endorser for Broadway Gems. In May 2018, she became the endorser for Nestea Milk Tea. Entrata became one of the celebrity ambassadors of TikTok Philippines. In June 2018, Maymay became the endorser of Belo Essentials Papaya Soap. On November 2018, she became the brand ambassador of Megan Beauty Products.

Filmography

Film

Television

Digital

Book

Discography

Albums

Singles

Awards and nominations

Tours 
 The Dream Tour: Maymay in Concert (2018)

References

External links 
 

1997 births
Living people
ABS-CBN personalities
Big Brother (franchise) winners
Pinoy Big Brother contestants
Star Magic
Visayan people
People from Camiguin
People from Cagayan de Oro
21st-century Filipino women singers
Star Music artists